1988 Winter Olympics marketing was a long running campaign that began when Calgary won its bid to host the games in 1981.

Symbols

Emblem

The organizing committee Olympiques Calgary Olympics '88 (OCO'88) chose a stylized snowflake used for the 1981 bid by the Calgary Olympic Development Association (CODA) as the symbol for the 1988 Games. The snowflake is made up of interlocking "c"'s, small "c"'s representing Calgary, and the large "c"'s representing Canada. The five interlocking "c"'s represented the theme of the 1988 Games "Come Together in Calgary".

Motto 
The official motto of the 1988 Winter Olympics was Coming Together in Calgary.

Mascots 

OCO'88 introduced the mascots of the Calgary Games Hidy and Howdy, at the closing ceremony of the 1984 Winter Olympics in Sarajevo. The mascots named "Hidy" and "Howdy", chosen through a public contest, were a smiling cowboy-themed polar bears designed to evoke images of "western hospitality". The mascots were played by a team of 150 students from Bishop Carroll High School, the sister-brother pair made up to 300 appearances per month in the lead up to the Games. From their introduction at the closing ceremonies of the Sarajevo Games in 1984 until their retirement at the conclusion of the Calgary Games, the pair made about 50,000 appearances.

Corporate sponsorship and advertising 
At the conclusion of the 1988 Winter Games, OCO'88 noted that corporate partnerships generated  million in revenue, which was 16 per cent of the  million OCO'88 generated in revenue. For the 1988 Winter Games there were 21 sponsors, 30 suppliers, 40 licensees, 27 contributors and one donor. Official sponsors were categorized into tiers based on contribution total, with  million separating each tier, official sponsors resulted in  million in support for the Games. Official suppliers were required to provide at least  in contributions, official suppliers resulted in  million in support for the Games. Licensing programs were seen as successful in Canada, but unsuccessful in international markets due to challenges negotiation with individual National Olympic Committees.

Sponsors 
Anheuser-Busch
ATCO Development
Canada Safeway
Coca-Cola Company
FedEx
General Motors of Canada
IBM Canada
Kodak Canada
Labatt Brewing Company
Matsushita Electric Trading
Motorola
Nova
Petro-Canada
Philips Electronics
Royal Bank of Canada
Shell Canada
3M
Time Inc./Sports Illustrated
Visa International
Xerox Canada

Team Petroleum '88 
Team Petroleum '88 was a program developed by OCO'88 as a program to engage oil and gas corporations in the Calgary region with the Olympic Games. Participating corporations were not provided any marketing rights, but were instead given access to tickets in a special lounge at the Olympic Saddledome for high-profile events, and priority access to tickets in other events. The Team Petroleum '88 program generated  million in revenue from 44 corporations.

Official songs and anthems 
The official song of the 1988 Winter Olympics was Can't You Feel It, composed by Canadian David Foster for the Games.

References 

Official reports
 

 Other works
 

Marketing
Olympic marketing